A destination spa or health resort is a resort centered on a spa, such as a mineral spa. Historically, many such spas were developed at the location of natural hot springs or mineral springs; in the era before modern biochemical knowledge and pharmacotherapy, "taking the waters" was often believed to have great medicinal powers. Even without such mystic powers, however, the stress relief and health education of spas also often has some degree of positive effect on health. Typically, over a seven-day stay, such facilities provide a comprehensive program that includes spa services, physical fitness activities, wellness education, healthy cuisine, and special interest programming.

Some destination spas offer an all-inclusive program that includes facilitated fitness classes, healthy cuisine, educational classes and seminars, as well as similar to a beauty salon or a day spa. Guests reside and participate in the program at a destination spa instead of just visiting for a treatment or pure vacation. Some destination spas are in tropical locations or in spa towns.

Destination spas have been in use for a considerable time, and some are no longer used but are rather  preserved as elements of earlier history; for example, Gilroy Yamato Hot Springs in California is such a historically used spa whose peak patronage occurred in the late 19th and early 20th century.   

Resort spas are generally located in resorts, and offer similar services via rooms with services, meals, body treatments, and fitness a la carte.

Types of services
Typical services include:
Balneotherapy: bathing in hot or cold water, massage through moving water, relaxation, or stimulation. 
Body treatments such as body wraps, aromatherapy
Cooking lessons
Electrolysis
Facials - facial cleansing with any of a variety of products
Fitness consultation
Hair care spa treatment
Ionithermie
Massage
Medical treatment
Nail care (manicure and pedicure)
Nutrition counseling
Skin exfoliation - including chemical peels and microdermabrasion
Waxing - the removal of body hair with hot wax
Weight loss

External links

 International Spa Association

.

Skin care
Massage
Resorts by type
Destination